Middle East Airlines Flight 438 was an international passenger flight operated by a Boeing 720 from Beirut, Lebanon, to Muscat, Oman, with a stopover in Abu Dhabi, United Arab Emirates. On 1 January 1976 the aircraft operating the flight was destroyed by a bomb, killing all 81 people on board. The bombers were never identified.

Aircraft 
The aircraft involved was a Boeing 720-023B (serial number 18020 and serial 165). Its first flight was on 23 September 1960. The aircraft was registered as N7534A and was delivered to American Airlines on 10 October the same year. In July 1971, American Airlines sold the aircraft for repair. On 3 March 1972, the aircraft was sold to Middle East Airlines where it was re-registered as OD-AFT. The aircraft was powered by four Pratt & Whitney JT3D-1-MC7 turbofan engines with water cooling and a thrust of 17,000 pounds each.

Bombing 
Flight ME438 was an international passenger flight from Beirut, Lebanon to Muscat, Oman, with a stopover in Dubai, United Arab Emirates. With 15 crew members and 66 passengers (other sources stated that there were 67 passengers) on board, flight 438 departed from Beirut. In the predawn twilight, the airliner was en route from Beirut to Dubai when at 05:30, 1 hour and 40 minutes after departure, a bomb exploded in the front section of the cargo hold. The crash was the deadliest aviation disaster to occur in Saudi Arabia at the time, and is now the sixth-deadliest. It is also the second-deadliest aviation disaster involving the Boeing 720, behind Pakistan International Airlines Flight 705.

Investigation 
According to several reports, the bomb was planted on board by Omani militants. The bomb timer was set so that the bomb would explode after landing at Muscat airport. Killing the passengers was not the goal of the militants. Flight 438 was originally going to be operated by a Boeing 747, but a technical malfunction was discovered, requiring a Boeing 720 to be used instead. Boarding and baggage loading delayed the flight, causing the bomb to explode early while the aircraft was still cruising.

References

External links 
 
 UK CAA Document CAA 429 World Airline Accident Summary (ICAO Summary 4/76)

Mass murder in 1976
Aviation accidents and incidents in 1976
Middle East Airlines
Terrorist incidents in Asia in 1976
1976 in Lebanon
1976 in Saudi Arabia
Unsolved airliner bombings
Aviation accidents and incidents in Saudi Arabia
Airliner bombings
January 1976 events in Asia
Accidents and incidents involving the Boeing 707
1976 disasters in Saudi Arabia